Neodrillia cydia, common name the Cydia drillia, is a species of sea snail, a marine gastropod mollusk in the family Drilliidae.

Description
The size of an adult shell varies between 10 mm and 22 mm.

Distribution
This species occurs in the Western Atlantic off North Carolina, in the Caribbean Sea off Panama and Jamaica, and off the Lesser Antilles (Antigua, Barbados, St. Thomas)

References

 Bartsch, P. (1943) A review of some West Atlantic turritid mollusks. Memorias de la Sociedad Cubana de Historia Natural, 17, 81–122, pls. 7–15

External links
 Rosenberg, G., F. Moretzsohn, and E. F. García. 2009. Gastropoda (Mollusca) of the Gulf of Mexico, Pp. 579–699 in Felder, D.L. and D.K. Camp (eds.), Gulf of Mexico–Origins, Waters, and Biota. Biodiversity. Texas A&M Press, College Station, Texas
 
 Bisby, F.A., M.A. Ruggiero, K.L. Wilson, M. Cachuela-Palacio, S.W. Kimani, Y.R. Roskov, A. Soulier-Perkins and J. van Hertum 2005 Species 2000 & ITIS Catalogue of Life: 2005 Annual Checklist. CD-ROM; Species 2000: Reading, U.K.
 De Jong K.M. & Coomans H.E. (1988) Marine gastropods from Curaçao, Aruba and Bonaire. Leiden: E.J. Brill. 261 pp. 

cydia
Gastropods described in 1943